Ramat Hanadiv (Heights of the Benefactor), is a nature park and garden in northern Israel, covering  at the southern end of Mount Carmel between Zikhron Ya'akov to the north and Binyamina to the south. The Jewish National Fund planted pine and cypress groves in most of the area.

History
In 1882, during the late Ottoman era, the PEF's Survey of Western Palestine (SWP) found at Umm el Alak only "ruined walls." The name meant "producing leeches." A population list from about 1887 showed that Umm el Alaq had about 85 residents, all Muslim.

Umm el-'Aleq was a small Arab village where in the 19th century a farmstead (Beit Khouri) was constructed by the Christian Arab family of el-Khouri from Haifa. French Baron Edmond de Rothschild purchased the land from the el-Khouri family. The Jews coming during the Third Aliyah in 1919 changed the name of the region to "Ummlaleq" ("the miserable one"); their diaries recorded conflicts with the evicted Arabs as well as malarial mosquitoes proving to be an impediment to settlement within the region.

In the 1922 census of Palestine, conducted by the British Mandate authorities, Umm al-Alaq had a population of 14 Jews.

Archaeology
Yitzar Hirschfeld has carried out archaeological digs in Ramat Hanadiv over a period of 14 years. The excavations at Horvat ‘Aqav and Horvat Eleq, has unearthed remains from three periods: a small Phoenician shrine, a Herodian estate manor and a Byzantine period villa. It has been hypothesized that there was a spread of malarial mosquitoes in Ramat Hanadiv during the late Byzantine period.

Horvat 'Eleq
The excavations at Horvat 'Eleq uncovered a Jewish Hellenistic-period settlement, a huge Herodian fortified complex, and a Roman-period bathhouse, in addition to a water system and the 19th-century Umm el-'Aleq.

Horvat 'Aqav
The excavations of the late 1st century BCE Herodian manor complex at Horvat 'Aqav revealed the base of a three storied tower, stables, two wine presses and an olive press. The Herodian manor also had a bath house, fed by a hypocaust system, with caldarium and swimming pool. Crosses found on roof tiles and bowls at the Horvat 'Aqav excavation from the Byzantine era may indicate that the later occupants of the site were Christians.

Ein Tzur

Where a spring on the mountain is visited by women seeking to become pregnant by bathing in its waters. This is due to a hoard of more than 2,000 coins being discovered in the pool of Ein Tzur, indicating that it was a place of pilgrimage from the 3rd to 7th century.

Kebara Cavern
The Kebara cavern, with 10 prehistoric layers of occupation, covering from middle Palaeolithic to late Mesolithic, is also within the Ramat Hanadiv region.

Green Technology 
In 1994, a special "Green Waste" recycling project was launched in Ramat Hanadiv, to serve as an example for gardening contractors, regional councils and municipalities. Forestry and gardening waste – branches, grass, leaves and others – are collected and processed into compost that is then reused for gardening.

A wastewater purification facility was installed at Ramat Hanadiv in 1998. This is a Bio-Disc type facility used for the purification of the wastewater generated by the office and public lavatories at the Gardens.

On 12 March 2008, Ramat Hanadiv's Visitors Pavilion became the first building in Israel to be granted standard certification for sustainable construction. The new Visitors Pavilion was designed by the architectural firm of Ada Karmi Melamede with the objective of making as little impact as possible on the environment.

Indoor climate control is provided by the region's first earth energy system, also known as a geothermal heat pump system, consisting of an electrically powered compressor and exchanger device connected to a series of small diameter pipes buried in the earth to create an energy exchanger through which heat energy can either be captured from inside the building and rejected into the earth, or reversed to capture heat energy from the earth and deposited into the building.

The Visitors Pavilion has been built as a green mound covered with soil and vegetation. It houses an assembly hall where visitors can watch a film on Ramat Hanadiv, a gallery displaying temporary exhibitions on themes relevant to the site, a lecture hall, education centre, refreshment stand and restaurant.

Footnotes

Bibliography

External links
Ramat Hanadiv - official website
Welcome To Kh. Umm al-'Alaq
Survey of Western Palestine, Map 8: IAA, Wikimedia commons 

Archaeological sites in Israel
Parks in Israel
Heritage listed sites in Israel
Gardens in Israel
Tourist attractions in Haifa District